Avenue France is a shopping mall in Suwon and Seongnam, South Korea.

References

External links
Avenue France Pangyo
Avenue France Gwanggyo

 

Shopping malls in South Korea